Come Get It may refer to:

Come Get It!, an album by Rick James
Come Get It: The Very Best of Aaron Carter, an album
"Come Get It", a song by The Chipmunks from Alvin and the Chipmunks: Original Motion Picture Soundtrack
"Come Get It", a song by Yummy Bingham from The First Seed

See also
Come and Get It (disambiguation)